Aldgate may refer to:

Aldgate, one of the city gates of the City of London and a road near the site of Aldgate. Now a Ward of the City of London
Aldgate tube station in the City of London
Aldgate East tube station in the London Borough of Tower Hamlets
Aldgate, Rutland a village in the County of Rutland, England
Aldgate, South Australia, a town in the Adelaide Hills in Australia